Dennis John Eckhoff (May 23, 1945 – October 6, 1995) was an American football player and coach. He served as the head football coach at New Mexico Highlands University in Las Vegas, New Mexico in 1983, compiling a record of 1–9. Eckhoff played college football at North Iowa Area Community College (then known as Mason City Junior College) in 1964 before graduating from Westmar University in Le Mars, Iowa in 1967.

Head coaching record

College

References

1945 births
1995 deaths
New Mexico Highlands Cowboys football coaches
Westmar Eagles football players
High school football coaches in Iowa
Junior college football players in the United States
People from Charles City, Iowa
Players of American football from Iowa